Parashqevi Simaku (born 1 September 1966, in Kavajë) is an Albanian singer noted for her work in the 1980s. She has won numerous awards and worked with some of the best composers and musicians in Albania. Simaku participated in Festivali i Këngës in 1982, 1983, 1985, 1986, 1987, 1988, and 1990. In 2006 she signed a contract with Sony and BMG for her Albanian-language CD entitled Echoes from Iliria.

Traditional folk songs 
 ""
 ""
 ""
 ""
 ""
 ""
 ""
 ""
 "" 
 "" 
 "" 
 ""
 ""
 ""

Pop songs
 "" (1983)
 "" (1985), Festivali i Këngës winner
 "" (1986)
 "" (1986)
 "" (1987)
 "" 
 ""
 ""
 "" (1987)
 "" (1987)
 "" (1988), Festivali i Këngës winner
 "" (1988)
 "" (1989)
 "" (1989)
 "" (1990)
 "" (1990)
 "" (1991)
 ""
 "" 
 ""
 "" 
 "" 
 "" 
 ""
 "" 
 ""
 ""
 ""
 ""

Echoes from Iliria
 "" 
 ""
 ""
 ""
 ""
 ""
 ""
 ""
 ""
 ""

Awards

Festivali i Këngës

|-
||1982
||" (ft. Lindita Theodhori)"
|Second Prize
|
|-
||1985
||""
|First Prize
|
|-
||1986
||""
|Third Prize
|
|-
||1988
||""
|First Prize
|
|-
||1989
||""
|Third Prize
|
|}

References

1966 births
Living people
Singers from Kavajë
Albanian people of Aromanian descent
Aromanian musicians
20th-century Albanian women singers
Festivali i Këngës winners